"The Sponge Who Could Fly", also known as "The SpongeBob SquarePants Lost Episode", is the 19th episode of the third season and the 59th overall episode of the American animated television series SpongeBob SquarePants. It was written by Paul Tibbitt, Kent Osborne, and Merriwether Williams, with Andrew Overtoom and Tom Yasumi serving as animation director and Mark O'Hare as the director of the walk cycles in the beginning of the episode. The episode was produced in 2002 and aired on Nickelodeon in the United States on March 21, 2003.

The series follows the adventures and endeavors of the title character in the underwater city of Bikini Bottom. In this episode, SpongeBob wishes he could fly with the jellyfish. He makes several attempts to do so, but all of these fail. At home, SpongeBob is drying his hair and receives a phone call, he puts the hair dryer in his square pants, and the dryer inflates them, giving him the ability to fly. He goes around helping people, earning their admiration and becoming a superhero of sorts. However, other characters continue to ask increasingly unnecessary favors of him, leaving him no time to fly with the jellyfish.

The episode became available on the VHS of the same name and the Lost at Sea DVD on March 4, 2003. Tie-in promotions were made with Burger King, which released a series of toys. Upon release, "The Sponge Who Could Fly" gained seven million views receiving mixed to positive reviews from television critics, especially concerning the live action segments. "The Sponge Who Could Fly" was adapted into a musical called SpongeBob SquarePants Live! The Sponge Who Could Fly!, which toured selected cities in Asia, in 2007. The musical was renamed to SpongeBob SquarePants: The Sponge Who Could Fly! A New Musical when it toured the United Kingdom in 2009.

Plot
In Encino, California, SpongeBob fan Patchy the Pirate has presumably lost the "Lost Episode" of SpongeBob prior to the episode. After a segment of previous SpongeBob clips called "Remembering SpongeBob", and Patchy lamenting that he lost the episode, he sets off to find it using a treasure map. Throughout several difficulties, he eventually finds a VHS tape which holds the episode. He then returns home in glee, and watches the episode. However, the tape only shows a clip of SpongeBob doing a series of cheap walk cycles to techno music before abruptly showing SMPTE color bars. Patchy gets angry, and gets rid of his SpongeBob merchandise, including his SpongeBob underwear, which results in him running away. The real episode then begins to start playing, and Patchy returns, fixes all of his stuff in reverse, then enjoys the episode.

In the episode, SpongeBob wishes he could fly with the jellyfish. He makes several attempts to do so, including a biplane, bat wings, a lawn chair with balloons, and a giant kite pulled by a bicycle. All of these attempts fail, and SpongeBob faces ridicule from others. He tells those mocking him that "it is a sad day in Bikini Bottom, when a guy is ridiculed for having dreams!" They respond that they all have had unfulfilled dreams, and become an angry mob to chase him. SpongeBob runs off a cliff and falls into a truck of mud, then into a truck of feathers.

Back home, having given up on his dream, SpongeBob dries himself out when he receives an insulting phone call and puts the hair dryer in his pants. While he talks, the dryer inflates his pants, giving him the ability to fly. He goes around helping people, earning their admiration and becoming a superhero of sorts. However, the other characters continue to ask increasingly unnecessary favors of him, leaving him no time to fly with the jellyfish. When he tries to escape to Jellyfish Fields, a mob forms and chases him, but is unable to catch him. Cannonball Jenkins, formerly a farmer and later on, a sailor, launches himself at SpongeBob, popping the pants as punishment for refusing to do more favors, and sending him plummeting to the ground. Everyone then holds a funeral for his now-deflated pants. Upset, SpongeBob goes home, but the jellyfish help him fly and take him back there. Patrick arrives and asks if they could "fly over" to the pizzeria, but SpongeBob decides to leave the flying to the jellyfish, only for Patrick to literally fly off himself.

The episode shifts back to Patchy, who wants to replay the episode, but his difficulty with the TV remote causes him to accidentally destroy the tape by wearing it out and making the filmstrip come pouring out of his VCR. As a result, Patchy ends up getting tangled in the filmstrip and cries that he ruined the episode, and now it is lost forever. As the scene changes to an exterior shot of Patchy's house, but now at nighttime, the narrator assures the audience that whether or not the lost episode will remain lost, as long as there are stars in the sky, SpongeBob will live on in fans' hearts and minds. As the story ends with the stars forming a picture of SpongeBob, the narrator tells the viewers to get lost, thus ending the episode.

Production
"The Sponge Who Could Fly" was written by Paul Tibbitt, Kent Osborne and Merriwether Williams, with Andrew Overtoom and Tom Yasumi serving as animation directors. Tibbitt and Osborne also functioned as storyboard directors, and Carson Kugler, Caleb Meurer and William Reiss served as storyboard artists. Derek Drymon served as creative director. The episode originally aired on Nickelodeon in the United States on March 21, 2003, with a TV-Y parental rating. "The Sponge Who Could Fly" was one of the few episodes of the third season that aired during the production of the series' 2004 feature film. In 2002, series creator Stephen Hillenburg, with his crew, halted production of the show to work on the film, resulting in few airings of new episodes. Nickelodeon announced nine "as-yet-unaired" episodes would be shown. During the break in TV production, "The Sponge Who Could Fly" first aired during a two-hour "Sponge"-a-thon, while the other eight were broadcast subsequently.

Mark O'Hare directed and animated the walk cycles in the beginning of the episode. The cycle originated when supervising producer at the time Derek Drymon called O'Hare. O'Hare said "Derek would call me out of the blue for freelance, and it was tough to know the context of stuff." He remembered the crew gave him a "bad" synthesizer song, and he was told to do "some kind of weird walk to it." He said "I animated this bizarre SpongeBob walk and turned it in, and that was that." Eventually, Drymon saw the cycle and referred to it as "The Lost Episode" walk. O'Hare had no idea what Drymon was talking about until he learned it was already used in an episode. O'Hare said "so I just figured that it ended up on the cutting room floor, like a lot of stuff you end up doing in animation. I had no idea that he was referring to the actual name of the show ['The Lost Episode']." The live action scenes were directed by Mark Osborne (brother of the episode's storyboard director Kent Osborne), and were hosted by Tom Kenny in character as Patchy the Pirate, the president of the fictional SpongeBob SquarePants fan club.

"The Sponge Who Could Fly" was released on a VHS tape of the same name on March 4, 2003. "The Sponge Who Could Fly" was released on the DVD compilation titled SpongeBob SquarePants: Lost at Sea also on March 4, 2003. The episode was also included in the SpongeBob SquarePants: The Complete 3rd Season DVD on September 27, 2005. On September 22, 2009, "The Sponge Who Could Fly" was released on the SpongeBob SquarePants: The First 100 Episodes DVD, alongside all the episodes of seasons one through five.

Marketing
To promote the episode, Nickelodeon launched an on-air campaign called "SpongeBob's Lost Episode", which culminated with the premiere of "The Sponge Who Could Fly". Nickelodeon also partnered with Burger King to release a line of toys as a marketing tie-in to the event. The toy line consisted of eight figures, including SpongeBob Silly Squirter, Swing Time Patrick, Jellyfish Fields, Plankton Bubble Up, Squirt N' Whistle Squidward, Plush Shakin' SpongeBob, Karate Chop Sandy and Gravity Defying Gary. The promotion ran for five weeks, during which time one of the popular items on the "Big Kids" menu, Chicken Tender, came "in fun star and lightning bolt shapes." Craig Braasch, vice president of global advertising and promotions for the Burger King Corporation, said "These eight new, fun, seaworthy toys inside our Big Kids Meals provide hours of aquatic entertainment for our young customers."

Each of the toys released included a "clue card" containing a SpongeBob SquarePants character riddle. By visiting Nickelodeon's website, the viewers could answer the riddle in order to win digital SpongeBob trading cards. They could also enter sweepstakes to win an at-home SpongeBob SquarePants party for 25 people were "The Sponge Who Could Fly" was viewed on the winner's new large-screen television. Pam Kaufman, senior vice president of marketing for Nickelodeon, said "We are proud of the relationship we have built with Burger King Corporation and excited that SpongeBob is returning for his second Burger King promotion. The promotion is sure to bring the young Burger King customers all the fun they have come to expect from Nickelodeon and SpongeBob SquarePants."

Reception
Upon its release, "The Sponge Who Could Fly" was viewed by over 7.6 million people. However, the episode received mixed reviews from critics. David Kronke of the Los Angeles Daily News criticized the special as being a standard episode that has been padded out to an extra length, with the live action Patchy the Pirate segments being "not terribly funny" and "what should be lost." In his review for DVD Verdict, Bryan Pope criticized "The Sponge Who Could Fly" as "The one misstep" in an otherwise strong third season, as he felt it "veers too far away from Bikini Bottom and into unfunny live action territory." Tom Maurstad of The Dallas Morning News said "The Sponge Who Could Fly" was "not a very good episode," describing it as "another SpongeBob-and-his-love-of-jellyfish story" that does "not [have] enough laughs" and having "too much drippy sentimentality."

Dana Orlando of the Philadelphia Daily News expressed the opinion that both the cartoon and the live action segments of the episode were funny, and described "The Sponge Who Could Fly" as one of the best episodes to date. In 2003, the episode received a Hors Concours Honor for Recently Telecast Programs at the Banff Rockie Awards.

Musical adaptation

"The Sponge Who Could Fly" was adapted into a musical called SpongeBob SquarePants Live! The Sponge Who Could Fly!. It was launched in Singapore at The Singapore Expo Hall on May 31, 2007, and was the first customization of SpongeBob into a live musical event, joining a list of TV-inspired live offerings from Nickelodeon that includes Blue's Clues and Dora the Explorer. The musical also marked the first time Nickelodeon premiered a live tour outside the United States. The show is a story of courage and coming of age which tells of SpongeBob's desire to fly with the jellyfish of Jellyfish Fields. It traveled to five cities across Asia, including Singapore, Kuala Lumpur, Jakarta, Bangkok, and Manila, before it toured cities of Australia and New Zealand. A Mandarin-language version toured China and Hong Kong in the fall.

The script was written by Steven Banks, who had become the head writer for the series in Season 4, with songs by Eban Schletter. Gip Hoppe served as director, with choreographer and associate director Jenn Rapp, and the set was designed by Rialto vet David Gallo. The musical was produced by Nickelodeon and MTVN Kids and Family Group, partnered with Broadway Asia Entertainment.

In 2009, the show toured the United Kingdom and Ireland with the name of SpongeBob SquarePants: The Sponge Who Could Fly! A New Musical. It opened at the Hackney Empire in London, England on February 3, 2009. The musical toured the UK from March 2009 for six months with performances at the Hammersmith Apollo, Southend, Edinburgh, Birmingham, Reading, Salford, Sunderland, Nottingham, Liverpool, High Wycombe, Plymouth, Bristol, Cardiff, Oxford, Killarney and Dublin.

Alison Pollard choreographed and directed the UK adaptation and said that the episode already had a few songs in it, which helped with the conversion to a musical. She said "The episode chosen for the show already had four or five really catchy tunes in it, and the idea that he wants to fly with jellyfish is nice for the stage as well." The adaptation includes twelve songs of various styles.

English actor Chris Coxon played the role of SpongeBob. Coxon was a fan of the series and said "If I'd been told a year ago that I would be playing SpongeBob today I would have loved it, although I'm not sure I would have believed it." Coxon admitted it was difficult to adapt the show into a musical. He remarked "It is difficult because you are trying to recreate this character that is so fluid on screen. For example I'm just getting used to my square costume, although it does have an incredible design, so that, although I am restricted, I can do a lot of the things he does in the cartoon."

Critical reception

The musical was well received by most critics. In his review for The Sentinel, Chris Blackhurst brought along a seven-year-old child called Dylan Brayford, and his 34-year-old godfather, James Humphreys, from Nantwich to watch the musical. The two "weren't disappointed." Blackhurst said "The fast-paced tale of courage and dreams kept both entertained with plenty of hilarious moments for the children and a sprinkle of gags which flew over younger fans' heads but brought a wry smile to mums and dads' faces." Brayford summed it up, saying "It was good, but not quite as good as the TV show."

Gordon Barr and Roger Domeneghetti of the Evening Chronicle described the show as "a silly riot of colour[...] as you'd have to expect from an adaptation of a cartoon TV show." They lauded the song called "Ker Ching" performed by Mr. Krabs, saying "[It] stands out above the rest." Viv Hardwick of The Northern Echo said "Younger ones are just pleased to see a colourful collection of characters, vaguely resembling the ten year-old TV show cast, cavorting around the stage." Hardwick praised the role of Charles Brunton as Squidward Tentacles while John Fricker (Patrick Star) and Martin Johnston (Mr. Krabs) were said to "win the biggest costume contest."

References

External links

2003 American television episodes
2003 television specials
SpongeBob SquarePants episodes
Animated television specials
2000s American television specials
Television episodes with live action and animation
2007 musicals
2009 musicals